The Wistful Widow of Wagon Gap is a 1947 black-and-white comedy Western film directed by Charles Barton and starring the comedy team of Abbott and Costello. It was released on October 8 and distributed by Universal-International.

Plot
Chester Wooley and Duke Egan are traveling salesmen who make a stopover in Wagon Gap, Montana while en-route to California. During the stopover, a notorious criminal, Fred Hawkins, is murdered, and the two are charged with the crime. They are quickly tried, convicted, and sentenced to die by hanging. The head of the local citizen's committee, Jim Simpson, recalls a law whereby the survivor of a gun duel must take responsibility for the deceased's debts and family. The law spares the two from execution, but Chester is now responsible for the widow Hawkins and her seven children. They go to her farm, where Chester is worked by Mrs. Hawkins from dawn to dusk. To make matters worse, Chester must work at the saloon at night to repay Hawkin's debt to its owner, Jake Frame. Her plan is to wear Chester down until he agrees to marry her.

Chester quickly learns that no one will harm him, for fear that they will have to support Mrs. Hawkins and her family. Simpson makes Chester the sheriff in hopes that the fear of him will help clean up the lawless town. For protection, Chester carries around a photograph of Mrs. Hawkins and her kids. The approach works for a while, and Chester is heralded as a hero. Meanwhile, Duke still plans to go to California and tries to get Judge Benbow to marry Mrs. Hawkins, in order to free him and Chester from their obligations. He starts a rumor that Mrs. Hawkins is about to become rich once the railroad buys her land to lay tracks. The rumor takes on a life of its own, with everyone trying to kill Chester in hopes of marrying Mrs. Hawkins (and becoming wealthy in the process). Frame eventually confesses to Hawkins' murder; Duke and Chester are cleared and allowed to leave town, but not before they admit that the railroad rumor was fabricated by them. Benbow still wants to marry Mrs. Hawkins, and she agrees. She then announces that the railroad actually did offer her substantial money, and she is now wealthy.

Cast

Bud Abbott as Duke Egan
Lou Costello as Chester Wooley
Marjorie Main as Widow Hawkins
Audrey Young as Juanita Hawkins
George Cleveland as Judge Benbow
Gordon Jones as Jake Frame
William Ching as Jim Simpson
Peter M. Thompson as Phil (as Pete Thompson)
Bill Clauson as Matt Hawkins
Billy O'Leary as Billy Hawkins
Pamela Wells as Sarah Hawkins
Jimmy Bates as Jefferson Hawkins
Paul Dunn as Lincoln Hawkins
Diane Florentine as Sally Hawkins
 Glenn Strange as Lefty 
 Rex Lease as Hank
 Ethan Laidlaw as Cowboy (uncredited)
 Charles King as Gunman (uncredited) 
 George J. Lewis as Cowpuncher (uncredited)
 Emmett Lynn as Old Codger (uncredited) 
 Kermit Maynard as	Posse Member 
 Zon Murray as	Cowpuncher (uncredited)

Production
The film was based on a story by Bill Bowers and Buc Beauchamp which was based on a true life law from Montana that if you killed a man, you were responsible for their widow and children. Bowers says they worked on it for two hours, envisioning it as a vehicle for James Stewart and Marjorie Main, and sold it to Universal for $2,500.

The Wistful Widow of Wagon Gap was filmed from April 29 through June 20, 1947. The film was budgeted at $750,000 - a new lower figure set for Abbott and Costello movies. It went $28,000 over.

On May 3, during production of this film, Costello dedicated the Lou Costello Jr. Youth Center in memory of his son in Los Angeles. Less than a week later, on May 9 his father, Sebastian Cristillo, died of a heart attack. Costello blamed their agent, Eddie Sherman, for upsetting his father the night before (triggering the heart attack) and fired him. The team went without an agent for two years.

Comic book
The first issue of the Abbott and Costello comic book, published in February 1948 by St. John Publishing, was an adaptation of the film. Out of the forty issues published between 1948 and 1956, this was the only one that was based on one of their films.

Routines
Included is a variation on the Oyster routine used previously in 1945's Here Come the Co-Eds, this time using a frog.

Home media
Universal first released the film on VHS tape in 1992 and then on DVD through two releases. The first time, in The Best of Abbott and Costello Volume Two set, on May 4, 2004, and again on October 28, 2008 as part of Abbott and Costello: The Complete Universal Pictures Collection.

References

External links

 
 
 
 

1947 films
1940s Western (genre) comedy films
Abbott and Costello films
American black-and-white films
American Western (genre) comedy films
Films set in Montana
1940s English-language films
Films directed by Charles Barton
Films scored by Walter Schumann
Universal Pictures films
1947 comedy films
1940s American films